Jimmy Five, known as Cebolinha in Portuguese, is one of Monica and Friends main characters. He was created in 1960, at first as a support character for Franklin and Blu who the following year became the protagonist of his own series of newspaper strips, which was later replaced by the character Monica in the 70s. Currently Jimmy Five has his own printed comic book, called Cebolinha, which was first released in 1973.

Jimmy's family name is "Cebola" ("onion" in Portuguese), and he has a little baby sister called Mary Angela (in Portuguese, Maria Cebolinha, after her brother's name), also based on a real person.

His English name is Jimmy Five due to his hair composed of only five strands. In the first adaptations of comics into English, the character's name was Stanley, and later Frizz.

Concept and creation 
Jimmy Five first appeared in the second issue of the comic book Zaz Traz in 1960, as a supporting character for Franklin. Mauricio de Sousa, creator of Monica's Gang, says he based the character on a child he knew while growing up in Mogi das Cruzes. He was a friend of his brother Márcio, and the boy would also switch the letter "r" for "l" and, because of his pointy hair, he earned the nickname "cebolinha" from Márcio's and Mauricio's father. Just like a different language. At first, he was a 4-year-old boy who was a friend of Franklin and his gang, he was the youngest boy. Originally he was supposed to appear in only one story, but the character ended up becoming so well received that he continued to appear more and more frequently. In the first stories Jimmy Five was hairy, after Sousa returned to the newspaper strips, his design became more and more simple and began to be drawn with fewer hair strands.

Sousa liked the character and made him a separate protagonist of Franklin and Blu in 1961. In these comic strips in which he was the protagonist, he was just a normal little boy who had several weird friends, among these weird friends came Smudge, a dirty boy who later became his best friends and sidekicks. After the introduction of Monica (based on the Sousa's daughter) in the comic strips in 1963 he began to share the leading role with her over the years. In 1964 he came to have his current look with 5 hair strands. In 1970 with the release of the comic book, Monica became the title protagonist in place of Jimmy Five, but a comic book for Jimmy Five began to be published 3 years later. Since Monica became protagonist Jimmy Five has gained different characteristics, as a antagonist who aims to defeat Monica and dominate the leadership of the neighborhood (in reference to the fact that the character had his role of protagonist reduced in favor of Monica).

Characteristics 
Due to dyslalia, Jimmy Five is incapable of pronouncing the letter "r", replacing it with the letter l, in the Portuguese version, or with the letter w, in the English version. When the letter is used at the end of a word, however, he pronounces it normally (as in "car" or "locker").

Out of the main cast of Monica and Friends he is the only one to regularly wear shoes (when barefoot, he is also one of the rare characters to be shown with toes). He often complains and despairs over his main physical feature - his lack of any hair other than five single strands. His madcap attempts to rectify this often causes him (and those around him) a great deal of grief. He was originally drawn with a full head of hair, which often becomes a topic in his laments to the comic artist to "help him out" and restore his full head of hair.

He is always plotting to steal either Samson or the title of "owner of the street" from Monica with his "infallible plans" (which were initially created by Specs), which always end in failure, mostly because Smudge (his best friend) accidentally reveals to Monica that she is in a trap. On some stories, he gathers the other boys of the gang just to pick on Monica.

In some earlier stories, he devised background plans to find out the secret of her strength, but he always ended up beaten solely by her. Even with these frictions, Jimmy and Monica are still friends to each other. In the futuristic special edition stories, they are often portrayed as married or dating each other. Indeed, in Monica Teen, they are seen kissing.

It was once revealed that Jimmy is not the first one in his family to have his famous speech impediment and that it caused all his relatives (minus his father) to believe he will never be able to pronounce 'r'. However, this is disproven in the Monica Teen stories, where he is said to take up speech-language pathology sessions to correct his speech impediment; however, he reverts to mispronunciation when under stress or close to girls (especially Monica).

Whereas his family was always composed of his mother, father, and little sister, he once had a little brother, introduced in a 1972 story. Jimmy himself even ended the story asking his readers to send name suggestions to Editora Abril (which published Monica and Friends comics at that time), but the toddler ended up disappearing from the stories. Mauricio stated that he simply didn't have time to plan the continuation of his arrival, and the character was never featured again.

Related characters

Parents 
 Mrs. Five (Dona Cebola, lit. Mrs. Onion) – Jimmy's mother. Spends most of her time as a housekeeper, sometimes complaining about this. She is always worried about her weight.
 Mr. Five (Seu Cebola, lit. Mr. Onion) - Jimmy's father. Similar to Smudge's father, he is drawn simply as an adult Jimmy, the only differences being his nose and his height. He's very affectionate to his family and hard working with his job at a local business company. Unlike Jimmy, he does not suffer from speech impairments.

Mary Angela 
Mary Angela (Maria Cebolinha) is Jimmy's little sister, also introduced in 1960 in the comic book Zaz Traz. Her baby mind makes her a very curious and active person, which leads Jimmy to near-insanity, as he is the one to look for her when his parents are not home. Mary is based on Mauricio de Sousa's oldest daughter, Mariângela Spada e Sousa.

Fluffy 
Fluffy (Floquinho) is Jimmy's dog. Originally, the dog belonged to his cousin from the countryside, but ended up becoming Jimmy's. Due to his long hair, no one can tell his head from his tail, and vice versa. This long hair caught many reader's eyes, and after years of arguments between fans on what breed he really belonged to it was announced his breed as being Lhasa Apso. Apart from his head and tail problem, another recurring gag in his strips is the fact that his long hair can hide plenty of objects (at one point hiding a missing airplane and its pilot, a missing cruise ship, a hot-dog vendor, and the mailman all at once).

Reception and legacy 
Just like Monica, Jimmy Five is considered one of the great icons of Brazilian comics, and sometimes is even more popular than Monica. In December 2010 a special issue called "Cebolinha 50 Anos", of which celebrated the 50 years of the character was published. In 2019, the footballer Everton Soares started to adhere to the nickname "Cebolinha" in honor of the character, Everton admitted to being a fan of Monica's Gang and was later presented with a art made by Mauricio de Sousa. In 2018 a Graphic Novel focused only on Jimmy Five entitled "Cebolinha: Recuperação" was published, having been made by the artist Gustavo Borges. The comics are very popular in Brazil and Portugal, the U.S. is the country closing the podium.

A Jimmy Five vinyl doll appears in the 2007 Australian horror film Black Water, the appearance of this doll in the film was unknown to many of the fans until 2020.

Notes

References

External links 

Official Monica’s Gang website 
Official Monica’s Gang website 

Monica's Gang
Comics characters introduced in 1960
Comics characters who can move at superhuman speeds
Fictional characters based on real people
Fictional inventors
Fictional Brazilian people
Child characters in comics
Child characters in television
Comics characters with accelerated healing
Animated human characters
Fictional association football players
Fictional tricksters
Fictional characters with speech impediment